Manpreet Singh Gony (born 4 January 1984) is an Indian cricketer. He is a right-arm medium pace bowler and right-hand middle order batsman. In June 2019, Gony announced his retirement from all forms of cricket, except for short-format leagues played overseas.

Career
Manpreet Singh Gony made his debut for Punjab in the Ranji Trophy in the season 2007–08. He was later selected for the Chennai Super Kings in the Indian Premier League.

Gony has made his mark in the 2008 Indian Premier League matches. He played for the Chennai Super Kings. He was one of leading wicket takers in the Indian Premier League and also performed well with the bat, scoring crucial runs in the last overs. He was instrumental in the Chennai Super Kings victory against Delhi Daredevils. He took 17 wickets in 16 matches in the IPL tournament. His team, the Chennai Super Kings, were the runner's up of the IPL tournament. For the IPL season of 2011, Deccan Chargers picked him up for a sum of $290,000. 
Gony was later picked up by Kings XI Punjab for the season 6 of IPL. Gony got a chance to play his first match against KKR where he played a match winning innings of 42 off 18 balls with a strike rate of 233. He was presented with the man of the match for his powerful batting performance.

Gony was drafted into the Indian cricket team for the Tri-Nation Series in Bangladesh in place of Sreesanth who was ruled out with a side strain.

On 25 March 2012, Gony became the first player ever to bowl three maiden overs in a top-level Twenty20 match. Gony finished with figures of 4–3–5–3 in Punjab's Syed Mushtaq Ali Trophy quarter final win against Madhya Pradesh. He still holds the joint record for bowling the most maiden overs in a single T20(3).

He was the leading wicket-taker for Punjab in the 2017–18 Ranji Trophy, with 19 dismissals in five matches. In February 2017, he was bought by the Gujarat Lions team for the 2017 Indian Premier League for 60 lakhs.

In June 2019, he was selected to play for the Toronto Nationals franchise team in the 2019 Global T20 Canada tournament. In October 2020, he was drafted by the Colombo Kings for the inaugural edition of the Lanka Premier League.

References

External links
 

1984 births
Living people
Indian cricketers
India One Day International cricketers
Chennai Super Kings cricketers
Punjab, India cricketers
Deccan Chargers cricketers
Punjab Kings cricketers
India Green cricketers
North Zone cricketers
Colombo Stars cricketers